The Sawau tribe in Fiji is made of 6 villages on the island of Beqa,  to the south of Viti Levu, but the District is only made up of 5 villages.  They are as follows:
Dakuibeqa (Chiefly Village –Tui Sawau),
Dakuni,
Soliyaga,
Naceva,
Naseuseu and
Rukua – (Part of the Tribe  of Sawau but part of the District of Raviravi)

The people of Sawau are world famous for performing two cultural expressions:

Vilavilairevo (Firewalking) The phenomena was examined in 1902 when it was already a tourist attraction, with a "Probable Explanation of the Mystery" arrived at.
Yavirau or Qolikubu – (Fish drive)

References 

Populated places in Fiji